State Road 511 (NM 511) is a  state highway in the US state of New Mexico. NM 511's southern terminus is at U.S. Route 64 (US 64) southwest of Turley, and the northern terminus is at Colorado State Highway 172 (SH 172) at the New Mexico/ Colorado state line.

Major intersections

See also

References

511
Transportation in San Juan County, New Mexico